Kalstar Aviation was an airline based in Serpong, Indonesia. The airline was founded as "Kalstar Tour-Travel Co., Ltd" in Samarinda in December 1993 by Andi Masyhur.

History
Masyhur purchased the airline's first aircraft, an ATR 42, nicknamed KSE, in Bungay on 22 September 2008.

Although initially based in Samarinda, he formally began Kalstar Aviation in Serpong. On Kalstar Samarinda's maiden voyage, the airline flew from Samarinda to Tarakan, and later on to Nunukan. The airline grew quickly. By 2010, it had added another two ATR 42s to its fleet.

In 2013, Kalstar Aviation carried over 1 million passengers. All Kalstar Aviation aircraft carry the "bird" livery on the vertical stabiliser, introduced in the late 2008.

Kalstar Aviation launched the airline's mobile application, dubbed KALSTAR Mobile. Passengers can use the application to check flight arrivals and departures, and check in for their flights. The airline also provides in-flight magazine Kalstar.

On September 30, 2017, Kalstar Aviation has been forced to stops all of its flights inline with the letter of Transportation Ministry for improving its management in technical and finance matters. No timeframe was given for the airline resuming its flights.

Destinations



Java
 Jakarta,  Soekarno Hatta International Airport
 Bandung,  Husein Sastranegara International Airport
 Surabaya, Juanda International Airport
 Semarang, Achmad Yani International Airport

Kalimantan
 Balikpapan,  Sultan Aji Muhammad Sulaiman Airport
 Banjarmasin, Syamsudin Noor Airport
 Berau, Kalimarau Airport
 Ketapang, Ketapang Airport
 Kota Baru, Gusti Syamsir Alam Airport
 Malinau, Robert Atty Bessing Airport 
 Melak, Melalan Airport 
 Nunukan, Nunukan Airport
 Pangkalan Bun, Iskandar Airport
 Pontianak, Supadio Airport
 Putussibau, Pangsuma Airport
 Samarinda, Temindung Airport (Passenger + Cargo)
 Sampit, Sampit Airport
 Sintang Regency, Sintang Airport
 Tanjung Selor, Tanjung Harapan Airport  
 Tarakan, Juwata International Airport

Nusa Tenggara
 Denpasar Ngurah Rai International Airport
 Maumere  Frans Seda Airport
 Kupang El Tari Airport
 Ende  H. Hasan Aroeboesman Airport

Fleet
Throughout operations, Kalstar Aviation fleet consists of the following aircraft:

Accidents & incidents
 On December 21, 2015, Embraer 195LR registered PK-KDC overshot the runway at Kupang Airport while performing duty as KD678 from Ende to Kupang. Everyone onboard survived the incident.
 On 16 April 2016, ATR 72-500 PK-KSC of Kalstar Aviation flight KD931 was climbing from Banjarmasin to Kotabaru when the crew reported a fire indication in the number 1 engine. The plane returned and landed at Banjarmasin about 15 minutes later. The aircraft stopped on the runway and was evacuated. There were no injuries. Indonesia's Ministry of Transportation confirmed the aircraft suffered an engine fire indication, the engine was shut down.

See also

References

External links

 
 Kalstar Aviation Cargo

Defunct airlines of Indonesia
Airlines established in 2000
Airlines disestablished in 2017
Airlines formerly banned in the European Union
Indonesian brands